Yonghungdo Power Station (also called Yeongheung power station) is a large coal-fired power station on Yonghungdo Island near Inchon, South Korea, owned by Korea Electric Power Corporation. The plant is estimated to have been the coal-fired power plant which emitted the ninth most carbon dioxide in 2018, at 27 million tons, and relative emissions are estimated at 1.5 kg per kWh. Conversion to gas is being considered.

See also 
 List of coal power stations

References 

Coal-fired power stations in South Korea